China: The Forbidden City is a 1998 adventure video game developed by Cryo Interactive Entertainment and jointly-published by Cryo, Canal+ Multimedia and the Réunion des Musées Nationaux.

Gameplay

Plot
The game is set in 1775 in the Forbidden City. Superintendent Anjing is summoned by the Qianlong Emperor in the early hours to investigate the death of chief eunuch Wang. He retrieves a letter from the Empress dowager, in which Wang reveals a conspiracy where he was forcedly implicated in the illegal copying of documents and imperial seals, part of a vast plot to kill and replace the emperor. To unravel the plot and expose the culprits, Wang has carefully dissimulated clues and confessions throughout different parts of the city, including offices, palaces, the Imperial Gardens and more.

The game features an encyclopedic mode and an interactive guide to the city.

Development 
Cryo Interactive's 1998 suite of historical adventure games (including "Egypt", "China", and "Venice") achieved a net profit up 121% to 12.6 million francs while turnover grew by 54% to 239 million francs.

Voice actors

Reception 

According to Cryo Interactive's marketing manager Mattieu Saint-Dennis, China: The Forbidden City sold 210,000 units in Europe alone by December 2000. Of this number, France accounted for 60,000 copies. Michel Richard of the Réunion des Musées Nationaux noted that China ultimately "lost money", which the team blamed on the game's setting.

Jeux video argued that the encyclopedia featured within the title is more valuable than the game itself. Adventure Gamers described the game as "calm, languid, elegant, oriental". Les Echose praised the game's technical prowess and breathtaking 3D. Metzomagic found it off that some of the character spoke with a Scottish accent. La Nacion felt the title could have an application for parents to help their kids study. MeriStation felt it was an adequate game while not pushing any boundaries, and that it was identical in gameplay to Cryo Interactive's Versailles 1685 which had been released a month earlier. Just Adventure praised the title for being "entertainingly immersive and educational".

References

External links 
 China: The Forbidden City at MobyGames
 China: The Forbidden City at Behind The Voice Actors

1998 video games
Point-and-click adventure games
Cryo Interactive games
Microïds games
PlayStation (console) games
Video games developed in France
Video games set in China
Video games set in the 18th century
Windows games